Daviesia spiralis, commonly known as spiral-leaved daviesia, is a species of flowering plant in the family Fabaceae and is endemic to a restricted area of south-western Western Australia. It is a rounded shrub with tangled branches, scattered, twisted linear phyllodes and yellow and red flowers.

Description

Taxonomy
Daviesia spiralis was first formally described in 1982 by Michael Crisp in the journal Nuytsia from specimens he collected near Wongan Hills in 1979 . The specific epithet (spiralis) means "spirally coiled", referring to the leaves.

Distribution and habitat
This daviesia grows in mallee-shrubland near Wongan Hills in the Avon Wheatbelt biogeographic region of south-western Western Australia.

Conservation status
Daviesia spiralis is classified as "Priority Four" by the Government of Western Australia Department of Biodiversity, Conservation and Attractions, meaning that it is rare or near threatened.

References

spiralis
Taxa named by Michael Crisp
Plants described in 1982
Flora of Western Australia